Sea queens were how gay men who worked aboard mainly merchant vessels were described before the 1960s. They were predominantly effeminate gay men who worked either in entertainment or as waiters on cruise ships, often becoming off-shore 'wives' for heterosexual sailors for the duration of voyages. They could also be found within the Navy as the nonfiction historical monograph Hello Sailor! The Hidden History of Gay Life at Sea by Paul Baker and Jo Stanley describes through the stories and experiences of sea queens from the Navy. In addition to this, the use of the Polari language can be drawn back to sea queens along with the attempted expulsion of gay, male sailors in Newport, Rhode Island after WWI.

Written narrative

Hello Sailor! The Hidden History of Gay Life at Sea 
During the 1950s and 1960s a large percentage of gay men began joining the Navy. In the Navy, gay men could be truthful about their sexuality. They used it as an outlet of freedom where they could express themselves, whether that was through different clothing or other traits and were able to do this without the fear of being discriminated against.

Historical context

Polari 
Gay men may have used Polari to communicate during these times. Polari was a coded language used by gay men that used metaphors and coded or made up words to talk about the topic of homosexuality without others around them knowing.

Discrimination in Newport 
The community of sea queens and the flourishing number of gays in the Navy was not the only event that was happening during this time. Many other events can be linked to a surge in the gay population, but it didn't always end with a positive story to tell. One important event can be recalled from an instance in Newport, Rhode Island where gay, male sailors were being targeted by the military, discriminated against, and were even being arrested if they were found to be gay.

See also

 Hall–Carpenter Archives
 Men who have sex with men

References 

20th century in LGBT history
Cruising (maritime)
Gay effeminacy
Gay history
Homophobic slurs
LGBT history
LGBT terminology
Shipping